Joseph (Joe) Madison (born June 16, 1949), alternatively known as "The Black Eagle" or "Madison", is an American radio talk-show host and activist heard daily on SiriusXM Urban View.

Early life and education

Madison is a native of Dayton, Ohio., he graduated from Washington University in St. Louis, which awarded him an honorary doctorate in 2019.

Career

Radio career
Madison began his broadcasting career in 1980 at Detroit's WXYZ-AM radio station.

Joining an otherwise white lineup at WWRC-AM in the early '90s, he developed a crossover appeal handling issues that included race but were aimed at the station's multiracial audience.  He left in 1998, after the station fired its talent and changed format, to start an online chat show.

WOL and XM Satellite Radio
He also worked at WOL-AM, and was placed in syndication on the Radio One Talk Network and its XM satellite channel.  He left WOL in 2013.

Urban View on Sirius
Madison is heard Mondays through Fridays from  6am to 10am on Urban View channel 126, SiriusXM.

On Feb. 25 – 27, 2015, Joe Madison hosted a record-breaking marathon whereby he talked for 52 hours on his SIRIUS XM talk show. The broadcast is officially registered with the Guinness World Record Organization.

Political activism
He publicized claims of CIA complicity in moving cocaine into the United States, sought evidence, and promoted legislation to declassify possibly related documents.  On October 15, 1996, Madison, Dick Gregory, and John Newman launched a hunger strike to promote this legislation.

A quarter century later, he announced another hunger strike: this time to press for voting rights legislation.

Personal life
Madison has taken a DNA test indicating he has ancestry in Sierra Leone and Mozambique. Research done for Finding Your Roots revealed that his great-grandfather was a white man from South Carolina who fought for the Confederates during the American Civil War; and his biological grandfather was included in the Tuskegee syphilis experiment.

He lives in Washington, D.C. with his wife Sharon (Sherry) and is a father and grandfather. He earned his bachelors degree from Washington University in St. Louis.

References

External links
Official site
Joe Madison & Family - Picture

C-SPAN Q&A interview with Madison, December 16, 2007

American talk radio hosts
American people of Sierra Leonean descent
American people of Mozambican descent

1949 births
Living people
Place of birth missing (living people)
Washington University Bears football players
NAACP activists
General Motors people
St. Louis Cardinals (football)
Service Employees International Union people
People from Dayton, Ohio
Washington University in St. Louis alumni